Vincent Perry Dailey (December 25, 1864 – November 14, 1919) was an American professional baseball player. He was born in Osceola, Pennsylvania and died aged 54 in Hornell, New York.

Sources

1864 births
1919 deaths
19th-century baseball players
Baseball players from New York (state)
Major League Baseball outfielders
Cleveland Spiders players
Scranton Miners players
Allentown Peanuts players
Kalamazoo Kazoos players
Oakland Colonels players
Elmira Gladiators players
Harrisburg Senators players
Lancaster Chicks players
Williamsport Demorest Bicycle Boys players
Batavia Giants players
Geneva Alhambras players
People from Lewis County, New York